The Medicine Men (or Beats by the Pound) are a New Orleans, Louisiana-based American music production team made up of KLC, Mo B. Dick, Craig B, Carlos Stephens, DJ Daryl, and O'Dell.

The collective helped sell 30 million records for Master P's No Limit Records, from 1995 to 1999, as well the majority of releases from No Limit Records during the days it was distributed by Priority Records. They would later receive nomination for Producers of the Year and collectively be voted as one of Hip-Hop's "Thirty Most Powerful People" by The Source in 1999. From 1995 to 1999 many of The Medicine Men productions feature hooks from Mo B. Dick or O'Dell credited as a featured artist.

Singles produced

Other production

Members
Current members
 KLC (1995–present)
 Mo B. Dick (1995–present)
 Craig B (1996–present)
 O'Dell (1997–present)
 Carlos Stephens (1995–present)
 DJ Daryl (1996–present)

References

American hip hop groups
Southern hip hop groups
Tommy Boy Records artists
No Limit Records artists
American hip hop record producers
Record production teams